The 1997 season was the sixth full year of competitive football in the Baltic country as an independent nation. The Estonia national football team continued in the qualifying tournament for the 1998 FIFA World Cup in France. The team ended up in fifth place in the final ranking of group 4, with one win, one draw and eight losses.

Lebanon vs Estonia

Estonia vs Scotland

Azerbaijan vs Estonia

Scotland vs Estonia

Austria vs Estonia

Estonia vs Latvia

Estonia vs Azerbaijan

Estonia vs Sweden

Estonia vs Andorra

Lithuania vs Estonia

Estonia vs Latvia

Estonia vs Faroe Islands

Estonia vs Austria

Latvia vs Estonia

Sweden vs Estonia

Philippines vs Estonia

Notes

References
 RSSSF detailed results
 RSSSF detailed results
 RSSSF detailed results
 RSSSF detailed results

1997
1997 national football team results
National